George Cosson (21 January 1876 – 15 June 1963) was an American politician.

Born in Laclede County, Missouri, on 21 January 1876, Cosson attended school in Manning, Iowa, and subsequently enrolled at Normal School at Valparaiso and the University of Iowa. He began working for Milwaukee Road as a station agent and operator between the ages of sixteen and twenty. Upon graduating from the University of Iowa College of Law in June 1898, Cosson moved to Audubon and began practicing law.

Starting in 1904, Cosson served a single term as Audubon County attorney. In June 1907, he was appointed special counsel of Iowa, reporting to the state's attorney general, Howard Webster Byers. Cosson won the 1908 Iowa Senate election as a Republican candidate, and represented District 17 until 1911. He succeeded Byers as Attorney General of Iowa later that year, and served through 1917. He sought the Republican nomination for Iowa's 1916 gubernatorial election, losing to William L. Harding. Cosson contested the Republican nomination for the United States Senate seat held by Smith W. Brookhart in 1932. Henry Field secured the nomination and lost the general election to Richard L. Murphy.

In 1961, Cosson moved to his daughter's home in Des Moines, and retired from the practice of law in August 1962. He died in Des Moines on 15 June 1963.

References

American railroaders
1876 births
People from Des Moines, Iowa
University of Iowa College of Law alumni
People from Carroll County, Iowa
1963 deaths
Valparaiso University alumni
District attorneys in Iowa
Iowa Attorneys General
20th-century American politicians
20th-century American lawyers
19th-century American lawyers
Republican Party Iowa state senators
People from Audubon, Iowa
People from Laclede County, Missouri